City Park is a neighborhood of the city of New Orleans, USA. A subdistrict of the Lakeview District Area, its boundaries as defined by the City Planning Commission are: Allen Toussaint Boulevard to the north, Bayou St. John to the east, Orleans Avenue, North Carrollton Avenue and Toulouse Street to the south and City Park and Orleans Avenues to the west. The neighborhood is named after and dominated by City Park (New Orleans).

Geography

Adjacent neighborhoods
 Lake Shore - Lake Vista (north)
 Mid-City (south)
 Lakeview, New Orleans (west)
 Navarre, New Orleans (west)
 Filmore, New Orleans (east)
 Bayou St. John, New Orleans (east)

Boundaries
The City Planning Commission defines the boundaries of City Park as these streets: Allen Toussaint Boulevard, Bayou St. John, Orleans Avenue, North Carrollton Avenue, Toulouse Street, City Park Avenue and Orleans Avenue.

Demographics
At the 2000 census, there were 2,813 people, 1,565 households and 580 families living in the neighborhood. The population density was 1,202 /mi2 (461 /km2).

At the 2010 census, there were 2,708 people, 1,447 households and 553 families living in the neighborhood.

See also
 New Orleans neighborhoods

References

Neighborhoods in New Orleans